Marzena Godecki (born 28 September 1978) is a Polish-Australian actress. She is best known for her starring role as Neri in Ocean Girl.

Early life
Marzena Godecki was born on 28 September 1978 in Bytom, Poland. When she was three years old her family emigrated from Poland to Australia. She was 16 and a modern dance and ballet student in Melbourne when she was selected from more than 500 girls who auditioned for the role of Neri in Ocean Girl.

When she first tried out for the part Godecki recalls being taken to a local ocean pier in Melbourne and thrown into the cold waters to see if she was comfortable. She was, and after landing the lead role, Godecki was able to sharpen up her swimming skills and learn how to scuba dive at the Ocean Girl location, Port Douglas in Far North Queensland, Australia.

During the filming, Godecki was able to swim with dolphins and even with a pod of Minke whales that came up to the film crew's boat.  Because much of Ocean Girl was filmed in the open water, she was always under the close watch of a stunt and dive safety team who kept a watch out for sharks.

Godecki took most of 1996 off from Ocean Girl to complete her final year at secondary school concentrating on her favourite subjects—maths and science. She originally hoped after the last season of Ocean Girl to secure a place at University in Australia in veterinary science owing to her love of animals.

Godecki married in 2008 and is now called Marzena D'Odorico. She has a son called Nico born in July 2008 and have been running the children's fashion store Tiny Threads in Melbourne, together with her business partner Melanie Tsoukas from 2008 to 2012.
She also has a daughter called Sasha born in late 2011.

Career
Before Godecki was selected for the role of Neri in Ocean Girl for her graceful style of underwater swimming, she was a student in Melbourne where she studied modern dance and ballet. She also went to Methodist Ladies College. 

Godecki was also a regular extra on the 1992 series of Round the Twist, appearing and sitting next to Linda in school scenes, but never is heard speaking. She was credited as "Beautiful Girl". Although in the episode "Nails" she is called "Madeleine" by Mr Snapper.

References

External links
 

Australian television actresses
Polish television actresses
Polish emigrants to Australia
People from Bytom
1978 births
Living people
Australian child actresses
People educated at Methodist Ladies' College, Melbourne